Once An Eagle is a 1976 nine-hour American television miniseries directed by Richard Michaels and E.W. Swackhamer. The picture was written by Peter S. Fischer and based on the 1968 Anton Myrer novel of the same name.

The first and last installments of the seven-part series were each two-hour broadcasts, while the interim episodes were 60 minutes.

The mini-series concerns the thirty year careers of two military men, from the outbreak of World War I to the aftermath of World War II.

Plot summary
Sam Damon (Sam Elliott) is a virile and praiseworthy warrior.

Courtney Massengale (Cliff Potts) is the opposite—an impotent, self-aggrandizing conniver.

The story tracks their journey over 40 years, between the First and Second World Wars, as their lives, and the lives of those around them, change along with the world.

Cast
 Sam Elliott as Sam Damon
 Cliff Potts as Courtney Massengale
 Darleen Carr as Tommy Caldwell
 Amy Irving as Emily Pawlfrey Massengale
 Glenn Ford as George Caldwell
 Ralph Bellamy as Ed Caldwell
 Dane Clark as Harry Sheppard
 Andrew Duggan as General McKelvey
 Lynda Day George as Marge Krisler
 Gary Grimes as Jack Devlin
 Clu Gulager as Alvin Merrick
 Robert Hogan as Ben Krisler
 Kim Hunter as Kitty Damon
 David Huddleston as Earl Preis
 Juliet Mills as Joyce
 Albert Salmi as Senator McConnadin
 John Saxon - Captain Townshend
 James Shigeta - Lin Tso-Han
 Barry Sullivan as General Bannerman
 Phyllis Thaxter as Alma Caldwell 
 Forrest Tucker as Colonel Avery 
 David Wayne as Colonel Terwilliger
 William Windom as General Pulleyne
 Anthony Zerbe as Dave Shifkin
 John Anderson as George Varney 
 Andrew Robinson as Reb Rayburne
 Patti D'Arbanville as Michele
 Andrew Stevens as Donny Damon
 Melanie Griffith as Jinny Massengale
 Kip Niven as Ryetower
 Kent Smith as General Jacklyn

Background
Once An Eagle was the second of four story subseries of the NBC anthology series Best Sellers; it was preceded by Captains and the Kings, and followed by Seventh Avenue and The Rhineman Exchange.

Anton Myrer's book, on which the series is based, is a military novel written in the United States. The novel is noted for its stark descriptions of men in combat and in its analysis of human and technical challenges and the moral dilemmas of command. It is one of only two novels on the US Army's recommended reading list for Officer Professional Development; the other is The Killer Angels by Michael Shaara. A coincidental element to both novels is that Sam Elliott had a starring role in the film adaptation of each one, playing a US Army general officer.

Filming locations
Some of the scenes of the film were filmed in Napa Valley, California.

DVD release
Timeless Media Group released the complete television series on a two-disc DVD set on August 31, 2010.

Origin of title
The title is derived from a Persian poem:
And so in the Libyan fable it is told,
That once an eagle, stricken with a dart,
Said, when he saw the fashion of the shaft,
"With our own feathers, not by others' hands,
Are we now stricken".
— Naser Khosrow

Awards
Nominations
 Emmy Awards: Emmy; Outstanding Cinematography in Entertainment Programming for a Series, J.J. Jones; for part I; 1977.
 Golden Globes: Golden Globe; Best Supporting Actress - Television, Darleen Carr; 1977.

References

External links
 
 
 Once an Eagle in the news

1970s American television series
English-language television shows
NBC original programming
Films based on American novels
Films based on military novels
Films set in the 1910s
Films set in the 1940s
Television series based on actual events
Television shows based on American novels
World War I television series
World War I television drama series
World War II television series
World War II television drama series
Films directed by E. W. Swackhamer
1970s English-language films